Fu Mingxia  (born August 16, 1978, in Wuhan, Hubei) is a retired Chinese diver, multiple Olympic gold medalist and world champion.  She won the platform-diving world championship in 1991 at the age of 12, making her the youngest diving champ of all time.  She is also famous for being one of the youngest Olympic diving champions, having earned a gold at the 1992 Barcelona Games when she was just 13 years and 345 days old.  Throughout the 1990s, Fu dominated the sport with her repertoire of extremely difficult dives.  During the 2000 Sydney Olympics, Fu won her fourth gold medal, joining Americans Pat McCormick and Greg Louganis as the world's only quadruple Olympic-diving champions.

Early life and career
Fu Mingxia was born into a working-class family in the city of Wuhan, located along the Yangtze River in central China. Inspired by an older sister, Fu enrolled in gymnastics at a local sports school at the age of 5. Though she was just a child, Fu demonstrated remarkable poise and body control. The coaches, however, felt that she was not flexible enough to make it as a gymnast. Instead, they suggested she pursue diving, though Fu, only about seven years old at the time, could not swim.

Fu made the transition from gymnast to springboard diver and before long was noticed by diving coach Yu Fen, who took Fu to Beijing in 1989 to train at a state-sponsored boarding school as a member of the state diving team. Because of her remarkable talents, she became a part of China's disciplined and highly successful elite sporting programs.

Through a strenuous training program, Fu learned to set aside her fears and progressed quickly. Training sessions averaged four to five hours a day, seven days a week, with the occasional nine-hour day. At times, Fu practiced 100 dives a day. In time, she was gliding so close to the platform during her dives that her short hair often touched the end during her descent toward the water.

In 1990, Fu made her international diving debut, capturing a gold at the U.S. Open and also at the Goodwill Games, held that summer in Seattle. Her daring dives from the top of the 10-meter platform transformed the teeny 12-year-old into a national treasure. However, with pressure mounting, Fu placed third at the Asian Games held in Beijing in the fall of 1990. Following the loss, she changed her routine, adding moves that were technically more difficult, but which she felt more comfortable performing.

By 1991, Fu was talented enough to attend the diving world championships, held in Perth, Australia. The competition was intense, and Fu found herself in eighth place in the final round because she had failed a compulsory dive. Fu pulled herself together, however, and ended up with the title, beating out the Soviet Union's World Cup winner Yelena Miroshina by nearly 25 points. At just 12 years old, Fu became the youngest international champion ever. It is a title she will hold forever because after the competition, swimming's national governing body changed the rules, requiring all competitors of international competitions to be at least 14 years old.

While Fu initially made her mark on the 10-meter platform, she also began competing on the three-meter springboard. In April 1992, she won the gold on the springboard at the Chinese international diving tournament in Shanghai.

Fu made her Olympic debut at the 1992 Games, held in Barcelona, Spain. During the competition, the 154 cm (5'1/2"), 43 kg (94.8 lb) Fu used her youthful fearlessness to beat out older competitors. Fu captured a gold in the platform competition. At 13, she was the youngest medal winner at the Olympics that year-and the second-youngest in the history of the Games. She also qualified as the youngest Olympic diving champion, a title she still holds.

Fu's success in her first Olympics drove her toward her second. In preparing for the 1996 Olympics, held in Atlanta, Fu trained seven hours a day, six days a week. Her only other activities included listening to music, watching television and getting massages. Fu's coaches drilled her hard, but she said she found comfort and peace from the physically and mentally straining regimen through music. Fu was in top form at the 1996 Olympics and shone on both the platform and springboard, taking gold in both events. She was the first woman in 36 years to win both events in a single Olympics.

Awards and accomplishments 

1990 Goodwill Games – 10m platform 1st (11 years old)
1991 Asian Games – 10m platform 3rd (12 years old)
1991 World Swimming Championships – 10m platform 1st (12 years old)
1992 Olympic Games – 10m platform 1st (13 years old)
1993 FINA Diving World Cup – 3m springboard 3rd (15 years old)
1994 World Swimming Championships – 10m platform 1st (16 years old)
1994 Asian Games – 3m springboard 2nd (16 years old)
1995 FINA Diving World Cup – 10m platform 2nd (17 years old)
1995 FINA Diving World Cup – 3m springboard 1st (17 years old)
1996 Olympic Games – 10m platform 1st (18 years old)
1996 Olympic Games – 3m springboard 1st (18 years old)
1999 University Games – 10m platform 1st (21 years old)
1999 University Games – 3m springboard 1st (21 years old)
2000 FINA Diving World Cup – 3m springboard 2nd (22 years old)
2000 Olympic Games – 3m springboard synchronized (with Guo Jingjing) 2nd (22 years old)
2000 Olympic Games – 3m springboard 1st (22 years old)

Retirement and comeback 
Shortly after Atlanta, the triple-gold-medallist decided to retire and enrolled at Beijing's Tsinghua University to study management science. Fu also got involved in politics and in 1997 served as a delegate to the Communist Party's 15th Congress.

Fu spent about two years off the board. By 1998, however, Fu began diving with the university team, but on her own terms. On her own terms still meant a disciplined training schedule, but she reduced the number of hours per day down to five. Fu found that practicing just for the sake of practicing to be a pointless endeavor.

As a member of the university team, Fu competed in the 1999 Universiade in Palma, Spain, winning both the highboard and springboard titles. Less than a year back into it, she won silver at the Diving World Cup. Fu regained her spot on the national Olympic squad and also took up a new sport - three-meter synchronized diving - as she headed for the 2000 Olympics in Sydney, Australia. Fu and her partner, Guo Jingjing, practiced together for less than six months, yet earned a silver. The Russian pair that beat them had trained together for years. After the synchronized diving event, Fu went on to compete on the springboard. She won a gold, nailing her final dive, a reverse one-and-a-half somersault, two-and-a-half twist for nines when eights would have been enough to beat out Guo, her teammate. With her four gold medals and one silver, Fu became one of the most decorated Olympic divers of all time. She is one of only three divers to win an Olympic double-double in the individual events: Pat McCormick and Greg Louganis being the other two.

Marriage and motherhood 
Fu married Antony Leung, former Financial Secretary of Hong Kong, on July 15, 2002, in Hawaii.  Their marriage was not publicly revealed until July 30, 2002. They have a daughter (born February 26, 2003) and two sons (born December 12, 2004, and April 25, 2008).

Though Fu is no longer diving, she was a member of the Beijing Olympic bid committee for the 2008 Olympics. Beijing won the bid, and Fu went on to serve as an ambassador at the event.

See also
 List of members of the International Swimming Hall of Fame
 List of divers

References
 New York Times, May 4, 1992.
 South China Morning Post, March 6, 1993; March 24, 2002.
 Straits Times (Singapore), February 28, 2003.
 Washington Post, May 22, 1991.

1978 births
Living people
Chinese evangelicals
Hong Kong evangelicals
Chinese female divers
Divers at the 1992 Summer Olympics
Divers at the 1996 Summer Olympics
Divers at the 2000 Summer Olympics
Olympic divers of China
Olympic gold medalists for China
Olympic medalists in diving
Olympic silver medalists for China
Sportspeople from Wuhan
Tsinghua University alumni
Asian Games medalists in diving
Divers at the 1990 Asian Games
Divers at the 1994 Asian Games
Medalists at the 2000 Summer Olympics
Medalists at the 1996 Summer Olympics
Medalists at the 1992 Summer Olympics
World Aquatics Championships medalists in diving
Asian Games gold medalists for China
Asian Games silver medalists for China
Asian Games bronze medalists for China
Medalists at the 1990 Asian Games
Medalists at the 1994 Asian Games
Universiade medalists in diving
Universiade gold medalists for China
Medalists at the 1999 Summer Universiade
Competitors at the 1990 Goodwill Games